Roos Glacier is a steep glacier that drains the northwest slopes of Mount Murphy on Walgreen Coast, Marie Byrd Land. Named by Advisory Committee on Antarctic Names (US-ACAN) after S. Edward Roos, oceanographer with the Byrd Antarctic Expeditions of 1928-30 and 1933–35. Buettner Peak is a sharp peak rising midway along the north wall of Roos Glacier.

References

Glaciers of Marie Byrd Land